James Ross (October 1, 1817 – July 16, 1895) was an Ontario farmer and political figure. He represented Wellington Centre in the House of Commons of Canada as a Liberal member from 1869 to 1874.

He was born in Arnage, Aberdeenshire, Scotland in 1817, the son of John Leith Ross, was educated at Marischal College there and came to Upper Canada in 1836. He was reeve for Nichol township from 1854 to 1859 and warden for Wellington County from 1858 to 1859. He was elected to the Legislative Assembly of the Province of Canada in an 1859 by-election in the North riding of Wellington and served until 1861. Ross also served as Crown Lands Agent. He was first elected to the federal parliament in 1869 after the death of Thomas Sutherland Parker. He lived in Cumnock and later Guelph. Ross died in Guelph at the age of 77.

References 

1817 births
1895 deaths
Alumni of the University of Aberdeen
Liberal Party of Canada MPs
Members of the House of Commons of Canada from Ontario
People from Aberdeenshire
Scottish emigrants to pre-Confederation Ontario
Immigrants to Upper Canada
Members of the Legislative Assembly of the Province of Canada from Canada West